Ada Mercedes Maza (born September 17, 1958, in La Rioja) is an Argentine Justicialist Party politician. She sat in the Argentine Senate representing La Rioja Province in the majority block of the Front for Victory.

Maza studied in La Rioja then civil engineering in Córdoba Province. Back in La Rioja, she studied mining engineering. She is a technician of legislative administration. From 1973 she was a student activist and from 1976, following the military coup, she was detained without trial until 1978. Following the return of democracy in 1983 she took an executive position in the provincial Justicialist Party and was elected a councillor in La Rioja, presiding the treasury and budget committee. She was vice president of the provincial Peronist Youth.

On October 14, 2001, Maza was elected as a Senator. She was re-elected in 2005, taking the place of her brother Ángel Maza, who did not take his seat but continued as governor of La Rioja. Previously close to former President and fellow La Rioja Senator Carlos Menem, she is now in the ranks of followers of Kirchnerism.

External links
Senate profile

References

Living people
People from La Rioja Province, Argentina
Members of the Argentine Senate for La Rioja
Justicialist Party politicians
1951 births
21st-century Argentine women politicians
21st-century Argentine politicians